The Cinderella Theory is the fifth studio album by American funk musician George Clinton, released August 2, 1989, on Paisley Park Records. It was released three years after his previous studio effort, R&B Skeletons in the Closet, which was his last album for Capitol Records. The Cinderella Theory represented a comeback of sorts for Clinton, who had been largely absent from the pop music scene since his last album for Capitol. The album was produced by Clinton for Baby Clinton Inc.

Track listing
 "Airbound" (Tracey Lewis)
 "Tweakin'" (Bob Bishop, Chuck D, David Spradley, Flavor Flav) (Featuring Public Enemy) (released as a single-Paisley Park 7-22790 and as a 12" single-Paisley Park 0-21337)
 "Cinderella Theory" (Amp Fiddler, George Clinton)
 "Why Should I Dog U Out?" (Amp Fiddler, DeWayne McKnight, George Clinton) (released as a single-Paisley Park 7-27557 and as a 12" single-Paisley Park 021157)    
 "Serious Slammin'" (Greg Crockett)
 "There I Go Again" (Amp Fiddler, George Clinton, Joe Harris)
 "(She Got It) Goin' On" (Amp Fiddler, Shawn Clinton)
 "Banana Boat Song" (Irving Burgess, William Attaway)
 "French Kiss" (Andre Foxxe, DeWayne McKnight, George Clinton, Steve Washington)
 "Rita Bewitched" (George Clinton, Tracey Lewis) (not available on the vinyl pressing)
 "Kredit Kard" (Clip Payne, George Clinton) (not available on the vinyl pressing)
 "Airbound (Reprise)" (Tracey Lewis)

Personnel
Joseph Fiddler, David Spradley, Bill Brown, Greg Crockett - keyboards
Bootsy Collins, DeWayne "Blackbyrd" McKnight, Andre Foxxe Williams, Steve C. Washington - bass
DeWayne "Blackbyrd" McKnight, Bootsy Collins, Tracey Lewis, Andre Foxxe Williams - guitar
William Payne, Dean Ragland, Lelan Zales, Richie Stevens - drums, drum programming
Anthony Jones, Darrin - scratchin'
Eric Leeds - tenor saxophone
Atlanta Bliss - trumpet
Michael Harris - flute
Larry Fratangelo - percussion
AJ - spoons
Pat Lewis, Sheila Washington, Jimmy Giles, Sandra Feva Dance, Lige Curry, Belita Woods, Tambra Makowsky, Navarro Berman, Pennye Ford, Patty Curry, Jenny Peters, Dean Ragland, Robert "P-Nut" Johnson, Joe Harris, Andre Foxxe Williams, Tracey Lewis, Jessica Cleaves, Karen Foster, Anita Johnson, Louis Kabbabie, Mike Harris, Garry Shider, Daryl Johnson, Daryl Clinton, Shirley Hayden, Steve Boyd, Angela Workman, Doc Holiday - vocals

Notes

References

External links
 The Cinderella Theory at Discogs
 The Cinderella Theory at The Motherpage
 Album Review at The Age

1989 albums
George Clinton (funk musician) albums
Paisley Park Records albums